The Netherlands competed at the 2010 European Track Championships in Pruszków, Poland, from 5 November to 7 November 2010. The event consisted of 11 different disciplines for elite men and women.

List of medalists 

Source

Results

Sprint

Team pursuit

Team sprint

Keirin

Madison

Omnium

Source

See also
  Netherlands at the 2010 UCI Track Cycling World Championships

References

2010 in Dutch sport
Netherlands at cycling events
2010 European Track Championships
Nations at the European Track Championships
Nations at sport events in 2010